Airport South (Terminal 1) station ( is a metro station on Line 3 of the Guangzhou Metro. The station is located directly below terminal 1 building of Guangzhou Baiyun International Airport. Unlike other metro stations in Guangzhou, it does not have dedicated entrances or exits at ground level. Instead the station is equipped with elevators and escalators that directly connect to the upper levels of the airport terminal building. The station began operation on October 30, 2010.

References

External links

Airport railway stations in China
Railway stations in China opened in 2010
Guangzhou Metro stations in Huadu District